Vermont Route 243 (VT 243) is a  state highway located within the village of North Troy in Orleans County, Vermont, United States. The route runs from the Canada–United States border at Potton, where the road continues into Quebec, past the North Troy–Highwater Border Crossing as Route 243, to VT 105 in the village center.

Route description 

VT 243 continues off of Route 243 (Route de Mansonville) at the US-Canadian border near the North Troy–Highwater Border Crossing United States Customs station and remains a two lane road its entire length. It proceeds southeast through the dense woods and runs parallel with the eponymous railway, passing by some homes. It intersects with Dominion Avenue, which dead-ends short of the Canada–United States border and becomes Railroad Street as it enters the village of North Troy. It also intersects Elm Street and School Street before making a sharp right turn to the south and becoming South Street as it passes through the neighborhood. The route intersects Main Street before reaching its southern terminus at VT 105 (North Pleasant Street).

Major intersections

References

External links

243
Transportation in Orleans County, Vermont